Massimiliano Palombara (1614 – 1680) was marquis of Pietraforte and Conservator of Rome between 1651 and 1677. He is the author of the La Bugia (the Candle), a book of verses, written in 1656 in Rome. He built the Villa Palombara which included five gates with occult inscriptions including the still-standing Porta Alchemica.

According to historians, his interest in the occult, Kabbalah and mysticism brought him into contact with Giuseppe Francesco Borri, Cardinal Decio Azzolino and his confidant, Queen Christina of Sweden (then living in Rome having converted to Catholicism).

References

Marquesses
17th-century alchemists
17th-century occultists
Italian alchemists
1614 births
1680 deaths